The Lorne Pier to Pub is an annual, 1.2-km open water swimming race held in January at Lorne, a town located on the Great Ocean Road in Victoria, Australia.  It began in 1981, when a member of the Lorne Surf Lifesaving Club, the Late Paul Lacey, had the idea to have a "fun" swim from the Lorne Pier through Louttit Bay and finish by body-surfing the waves onto the Lorne beach. The first swim was done by Paul and lifeguard Clyde Whitehand to test the course, the swimmers were greeted on the beach by an announcement by Sharkey and applause from beach goers, a small number compared to the thousands that greet the swimmers today. The first race took place a few weeks later following a surf carnival at Lorne. Competitors from the carnival and a number of Lorne locals dived and jumped off the pier and followed a course of buoys into the beach.

The race today consists of the same process.  Swimmers times are recorded at the finish line, and published in the Herald Sun Newspaper the next morning. The race is completed on average in 22 minutes, but the quickest race time is 10 minutes, 30 seconds.

The race attracts up to 4,000 competitors, and in 1998, it entered the Guinness Book of Records, with 3071 swimmers, making it the world's largest open water swim.  The race is organised by the Lorne Surf Life Saving Club with major partner Powercor. Proceeds from the race go to the Lorne Surf Life Saving Club.

In January 2020, the Pier to Pub swim celebrated its 40th Anniversary. The swim was conducted in a virtual format in 2021 and 2022 due to the COVID-19 pandemic. For 2023, the event was held in a hybrid format, an in-person format race and a virtual format race.

Mountain to Surf 
The Mountain to Surf is an 8 km fun run starting in Lorne and continuing through the forest and then along the Great Ocean Road and finishing at the Lorne Surf Life Saving Club. It is held the day before the Pier to Pub.

Notable Previous winners
 Olympic bronze medalist Rob Woodhouse won in 1986, 1989 and 1993.
 Two-time Olympic gold medalist, world champion and former world record-holder in the 1,500-m freestyle Kieren Perkins won in 1992.
 Four-time Olympic medalist Daniel Kowalski won in 1996 and 2007.
 British Olympian Ellen Gandy won the women's event in 2012.
 Four-time World Short Course champion and world record-holder in the 4×200-metre freestyle relay Lani Pallister won in 2018, 2019, and 2020.

References

External links
 Lorne Surf Lifesaving Club

1981 establishments in Australia
Sports competitions in Victoria (Australia)
Swimming competitions in Australia
Open water swimming competitions
Recurring sporting events established in 1981